Marielle Gallo (born 19 May 1949) is a French politician and Member of the European Parliament elected in the 2009 European election for the Île-de-France constituency.

She is the wife of famous French historian and member of the Académie Française, Max Gallo. She ran in a Parisian constituency in the 1993 election under the colours of the Citizens' Movement. In 2007, she joined the Modern Left, allied to President Nicolas Sarkozy. She became the party's spokesperson.

European Parliament career
In the 2009 European elections, she was the fourth candidate on the Union for a Popular Movement list in the Île-de-France region, and was elected to the European Parliament, where she sits with the Group of the European People's Party. In 2012, she emerged as a proponent of intellectual property rights and online copyright protection.

References

External links
 Institutional website (European parliament)
 Official website

1949 births
Living people
People from Lons-le-Saunier
Politicians from Bourgogne-Franche-Comté
Modern Left politicians
MEPs for Île-de-France 2009–2014
21st-century women MEPs for France
Citizen and Republican Movement politicians
Union for a Popular Movement MEPs
Union of Democrats and Independents politicians
Pantheon-Sorbonne University alumni